Troy Edwards (born April 7, 1977) is a former American college and professional football player who was a wide receiver in the National Football League (NFL) for seven seasons.  He played college football for Louisiana Tech University, became one of the most prolific receivers in college football history, earned All-American honors and won the Fred Biletnikoff Award.  He was selected by the Pittsburgh Steelers in the first round of the 1999 NFL Draft, and he played professionally for the Steelers, St. Louis Rams, Jacksonville Jaguars and Detroit Lions of the NFL, and the Grand Rapids Rampage of the Arena Football League.

Early years
Edwards was born in Shreveport, Louisiana.  He attended Huntington High School in Shreveport, where he played high school football.

College career
Edwards attended Louisiana Tech University, where he played for the Louisiana Tech Bulldogs football team from 1995 to 1998.  As a senior in 1998, he was recognized as a consensus first-team All-American and won the Fred Biletnikoff Award as the best college wide receiver in America at the conclusion of the 1998 season.

In the 1998 season opener versus the Nebraska Cornhuskers, Edwards had 21 catches for 405 yards—the most ever receiving yards in a single game by a college player.  His twenty-seven touchdown catches during his 1998 senior year remains the NCAA Division I-A season record.  He held the NCAA career record for touchdown receptions with fifty until it was broken by the Rice Owls' Jarett Dillard.  His 140 career receptions is the third most in Division I-A history, and his 1,996 receiving yards gained during his senior season remains the second most in Division I-A history.

Professional career
The Pittsburgh Steelers selected Edwards in the first round (13th pick overall) in the 1999 NFL Draft after the team lost out on David Boston to the Arizona Cardinals, making him the team's first draft pick from Louisiana Tech since selecting Hall of Famer Terry Bradshaw first overall in the 1970 NFL Draft. Despite high expectations for Edwards, he was quickly passed on the depth chart by other receivers, including Plaxico Burress (the team's first round pick the following year) and most notably Hines Ward, whom the Steelers used a 3rd round pick on the year before Edwards and was initially considered an afterthought when Edwards was drafted. This, combined with head coach Bill Cowher's tendency to run the football, inconsistency at the quarterback position from Kordell Stewart and various backups, and a rare decline in the Steelers on-field success led to Edwards openly admitting to his unhappiness in a 2001 radio interview--a year in which the Steelers returned to Super Bowl contender status. Years later, Edwards admitted that he should have handled his time better in Pittsburgh and blamed his immaturity for failing to live up to expectations.

In 2002, Edwards was traded to the St. Louis Rams, where he played a single season. In seven NFL seasons, he played in ninety-two games, started twenty-two of them, caught 203 passes for 2,404 yards and eleven touchdowns, and also compiled 1,560 punt return yards.

He finished his professional football career with the Grand Rapids Rampage of the Arena Football League in 2007.

NFL statistics

See also
 List of NCAA major college football yearly receiving leaders
 List of NCAA Division I FBS career receiving touchdowns leaders
 List of NCAA major college football yearly scoring leaders
 List of Arena Football League and National Football League players

References

1977 births
Living people
All-American college football players
American football wide receivers
Detroit Lions players
Grand Rapids Rampage players
Jacksonville Jaguars players
Louisiana Tech Bulldogs football players
Players of American football from Shreveport, Louisiana
Pittsburgh Steelers players
St. Louis Rams players